Margegaj is a village and a former municipality in the Kukës County, northern Albania. At the 2015 local government reform it became a subdivision of the municipality Tropojë. The population at the 2011 census was 2,346. The Valbonë River valley and the village Valbonë are located in the municipality.

The municipality included the settlements of  Margegaj, Dragobia, Valbona, Rragami, Çeremi, Bradoshnice, Dedaj, Koçanaj, Shoshani, Paqeja, Fushë-Lumi.

People
Shpend Dragobia
Haxhi Zeka, Albanian nationalist, born in Shoshani
Fatime Sokoli

References

Former municipalities in Kukës County
Administrative units of Tropojë
Villages in Kukës County